The grey-and-gold tanager (Poecilostreptus palmeri) is a species of bird in the family Thraupidae.
It is found in Colombia, Ecuador, and Panama.
Its natural habitats are subtropical or tropical moist lowland forests and subtropical or tropical moist montane forests.

Gallery

References

grey-and-gold tanager
Birds of the Tumbes-Chocó-Magdalena
grey-and-gold tanager
Taxonomy articles created by Polbot
Taxobox binomials not recognized by IUCN